Godiva is a genus of sea slugs, a nudibranch, a shell-less marine gastropod mollusks in the family Facelinidae.

Species
Species within the genus include:
 Godiva brunnea Edmunds, 2015 
 Godiva quadricolor (Barnard, 1927), the type species
 Godiva rachelae Rudman, 1980
 Godiva rubrolineata Edmunds, 1964
 Species brought into synonymy
 Godiva banyulensis (Portmann & Sandmeier, 1960): synonym of Dondice banyulensis Portmann & Sandmeier, 1960
 Godiva japonica (Baba, 1937): synonym of Sakuraeolis japonica (Baba, 1937)
 Godiva modesta (Bergh, 1880): synonym of Godiva japonica (Baba, 1937)

References

External links
 Godiva  at: Nudipixel, accessed 2016-12-20.

Facelinidae